Richard Harding may refer to:

 Richard Harding (forger), (1770–1805) convicted of forgery and uttering
 Richard Harding (rugby union), (born 1953) former Rugby Union player for England
 Richard Harding (cricketer), (born 1966) former English cricketer
 Richard Harding (curler), (born c. 1956) Scottish curler
 Richard C. Harding, Judge Advocate General of the United States Air Force
 Richard Harding Davis (1864–1916), American journalist and writer
 Richard Harding, pseudonym of American writer Robert Tine (1954–2019), author of "The Outrider" series.

See also
It may also refer to:
Richard Newman (English cricketer) (1756/57–1808), English landowner and cricketer who was born Richard Harding